Arthur Alonzo Coleman (March 18, 1898 - February 27, 1960) was a professional baseball player in the Negro leagues. He played from 1919 to 1921 with Jewell's ABCs, the Dayton Marcos, and the Columbus Buckeyes. In some sources, his career is combined with that of Clarence Coleman.

References

External links
 and Baseball-Reference Black Baseball stats and Seamheads

Columbus Buckeyes (Negro leagues) players
Dayton Marcos players
1898 births
1960 deaths
Baseball pitchers
Baseball outfielders
Baseball first basemen
20th-century African-American sportspeople